Alan Walter Blake (3 November 1922 – 31 October 2010) was a New Zealand rugby union player. A flanker, Blake represented Wairarapa at a provincial level. He played for the New Zealand national side, the All Blacks, in a single test match in 1949. Despite not having any Māori ancestry, Blake played 26 matches for New Zealand Māori and captained the side in 1950. He had an African American grandfather.

During World War II, Blake served as a trooper with the 4th New Zealand Armoured Brigade from 1943, and saw action in Italy. At the end of the war, he toured with the New Zealand Army rugby team, known as the "Kiwis", appearing in 24 matches.

References

1922 births
2010 deaths
People from Carterton, New Zealand
People educated at Wairarapa College
New Zealand rugby union players
New Zealand international rugby union players
Māori All Blacks players
Rugby union flankers
New Zealand people of African-American descent
Wairarapa rugby union players
New Zealand military personnel of World War II
Rugby union players from the Wellington Region